The City of David is the name given to an archaeological site considered by most scholars to be the original settlement core of Jerusalem during the Bronze and Iron Ages. It is situated on southern part of the eastern ridge of ancient Jerusalem, west of the Kidron Valley and east of the Tyropoeon valley, to the immediate south of the Temple Mount.

The City of David is an important site of biblical archeology. Remains of a defensive network dating back to the Middle Bronze Age were found around the Gihon Spring; they continued to remain in use throughout subsequent periods. Two monumental Iron Age structures, known as the Large Stone Structure and the Stepped Stone Structure, were discovered at the site. Scholars debate if these may be identified with David or date to a later period. The site is also home to the Siloam Tunnel which according to a common hypothesis, was built by Hezekiah during the late 8th century BCE in preparation for an Assyrian siege. However, recent excavations at the site suggested an earlier origin in the late 9th or early 8th century BCE. Remains from the early Roman period include the Pool of Siloam and the Stepped Street, which stretched from the pool to the Temple Mount.

The excavated parts of the archeological site are today part of the Jerusalem Walls National Park. The site is managed by the Israel Nature and Parks Authority and operated by the Ir David Foundation. It is located in Wadi Hilweh, an extension of the Palestinian neighborhood of Silwan, East Jerusalem, intertwined with an Israeli settlement.

Location 
The archaeological site is on a rocky spur south of the Temple Mount and outside the walls of the Old City of Jerusalem, sometimes described as the southeastern ridge of ancient Jerusalem. The hill descends from the Dung Gate toward the Gihon Spring and the Pool of Siloam.

Today, the archeological site is part of the Palestinian neighborhood and former village of Silwan, which was historically centered on the slopes of the southern part of the Mount of Olives, east of the City of David. In the 20th century, the village spread west and crossed the valley to the eastern hill, the site of the ancient city. Before 1948, the area was known in Arabic as Wadi al-Nabah, but was renamed to Wadi al-Hilweh after the wife of the local mukhtar who was killed in the 1948 Arab-Israeli War.

Naming
The name "City of David" originates in the biblical narrative where Israelite king David conquers Jerusalem, then known as Jebus, from the Jebusites. David's conquest of the city is described twice in the Bible: once in the Books of Samuel and once in the Books of Chronicles; those two versions vary in certain details. In his Antiquities of the Jews, 1st century Jewish-Roman historian Josephus repeated the story. The reliability of the Bible for the time period's history is subject to debate among scholars.

According to the Hebrew Bible, the name "City of David" was applied to Jerusalem after its conquest by David c. 1000 BCE, and is not to be confused with the modern organization by the same name and which showcases relatively small excavated portions of the larger city.

Israeli authorities also refer to the city as the City of David. The area's majority Palestinian Arab residents refer to it as Wadi al-Hilweh. Rannfrid Thelle wrote that the title "City of David" favors the Jewish national agenda and appeals to its Christian supporters.

Excavations and scholarly views 

The prevailing view of archaeologists is that the ancient site of the City of David lay on an elongated spur facing north-south, extending outside the wall of the Old City, south of its southeastern corner, in the southern part of the eastern ridge next to the Gihon Spring. The City of David was the ancient epicenter of Jerusalem and whose boundaries stretched from the Temple Mount in the north, thence southward to the Pool of Siloam, including the area marking the Kidron brook in the east and the adjacent dale in the west. Its area is about 50 dunams (ca. 12.3 acres).

The beginning of its settlement dates back to the Chalcolithic period and the Early Bronze Age, largely built-up around the natural spring, although not known then by the name City of David. The Old Testament claims that, after the conquest of Jerusalem, an earlier name for the site, Jebus, was replaced by the term "City of David". David's son, Solomon, extended the wall to the north and added to it the area of the Temple Mount whereon he built an edifice (Temple) to the God of his fathers. From the eighth century BCE, the city began to expand westward beyond the dale.

The debate within biblical archaeology on whether this site on the hill southeast of the Old City could be identified with what the Hebrew Bible calls Jebus and later the City of David, began in the late 19th century with the excavations of Charles Warren and Hermann Guthe. The 1909–11 work of Louis-Hugues Vincent and Montagu Brownlow Parker identified the earliest known settlement traces in the Jerusalem region, suggesting the area was an ancient core of settlement in Jerusalem dating back to the Bronze Age.

One of the stated objectives of the Palestine Exploration Fund (PEF) since its establishment in 1865 was to search for the true location of the biblical "City of David" and to report on its findings. However, after 130 years of research, surveys, and excavations in Jerusalem, only a few of the targets relating to the area of the City of David have been achieved and neither the location of the tombs of David and Solomon or the Ophel are known.

The City of David is one of the most excavated archaeological sites in the country and one of the first to be excavated. Many researchers of Near Eastern history often took part in digs within the City of David, among whom were: C. Warren - 1867-1870; H. Guthe - in 1881; F.J. Bliss and A.C. Dickie - 1894–1897; R. Weill - 1913–1914 and 1923–1924; M. Parker and L. Vincent - 1909–1911, in which they documented the location of tunnels and artifacts discovered in and on the bedrock in the areas around Warren's Shaft on the eastern slopes of the mountain above the Gihon Spring; R.A.S. Macalister and J. G. Duncan - 1923–1925, who discovered the Ophel ostracon in Wadi Hilweh of the City of David; J.W. Crowfoot and G.M. Fitzgerald - 1927-1928; K.M. Kenyon - in the years 1961–1967; Y. Shilo - from 1978–1985, and more.

More recent excavations (2000–2008) were conducted by R. Reich and E. Shukron on behalf of the Israel Antiquities Authority, and where they detailed Iron Age II findings in a rock-cut pool near the Gihon spring. In the "City of David Visitors' Center," before it was opened to the public, excavations were conducted in and around the general area of that site by a team of IAA archaeologists, again confirming the existence of a city dating back to the Iron Age II, and continuing unabated to the Early Roman period, and which, when the Jewish exiles returned to Jerusalem after the Babylonian captivity in the days of Ezra and Nehemiah, they continued to call the immediate area surrounding the Pool of Siloam by the name "City of David," although this name was eventually replaced by the name Accra.

According to Haaretz, "the prevailing theory in mainstream scholarship, that even if such rulers existed, they were monarchs of a tiny backwater." Today, scholars are divided amongst those who support the historicity of the biblical narrative of a united monarchy ruled by David, those who completely deny its existence and those who support its existence but believe that the Hebrew Bible contains theological exaggerations. A view held by Finkelstein, Koch & Lipschits (2011) that the City of David is to be placed on the Temple Mount has largely been rejected by scholars of historical geography.

Archaeological outline

Overview
The area is one of the most intensively excavated sites in the Holy Land. Archaeological practice at the site has been criticized for its practitioners not acknowledging political and corporate motivations, questionable field practice and overtly skewed interpretations.

Location and topography
It is on a narrow ridge running south from the Temple Mount. The site has a good defensive position, as it is almost surrounded by the Central or Tyropoeon Valley to its west, by the Hinnom Valley to the south, and the Kidron Valley on the east.

The ridge is currently inside the predominantly Arab neighborhood of Wadi Hilweh, which is part of Silwan, an East Jerusalem suburb.

Bronze and Iron Age
It is thought to have been the site of a walled city from the Bronze Age, which enjoyed the defensive advantages of its position. In the pre-Israelite period, the area is thought to have been separated from the site of the later Temple Mount by the Ophel, an uninhabited area which became the seat of government under Israelite rule.

In 2014, excavations at the Givati parking lot showed there had been no 10th-century city wall, meaning: no fortified settlement in the City of David during the Iron IIA (c. 1000–925 BCE), the time span usually proposed by biblical scholars for the reigns of David, Solomon and Rehoboam.

During the reign of Hezekiah (reign c. 716–697/687 BCE), the walls of Jerusalem were expanded westward, across the Central Valley from the City of David and the Temple Mount, enclosing a previously unwalled suburb in the area known today as the Western Hill of the Old City.

Exploration
Archaeological exploration of the area began in the nineteenth century, with excavations undertaken by Charles Warren in 1867. Warren was sent by the Palestine Exploration Fund. Warren conducted an excavation of the area south of the Temple Mount and recovered a massive fortification. The finding led him to conduct more excavations at the area south of the Temple Mount. There he revealed a vertical shaft descending from a slanted tunnel to an apparent water source. He suggested that the shaft was used to supply water to the city, which he believed was the old biblical city of David. Today this shaft is called after its discoverer "Warren's shaft", but his interpretation has been proven wrong, as the shaft is not man-made and had not yet been discovered by Jerusalem's inhabitants in the 10th century BCE.

There have been numerous excavations since and several digs are currently underway. Complete chronological lists of the digs are available at the website of the Israel Antiquities Authority, dating to following periods:
Late Ottoman
British Mandate
Jordanian
early Israeli

In 2010, an archaeological survey of the City of David was conducted by Rina Avner, Eliahu Shukron and Ronny Reich, on behalf of the Israel Antiquities Authority (IAA). In 2012–2013, two teams of archaeologists conducted surveys of the area on behalf of the IAA; one led by Joseph (Joe) Uzziel, and the other by Yuval Gadot. Archaeological surveys in the City of David continued in 2014, led by Uzziel, and Nahshon Szanton.

Dating
A four-year project started in 2017, called "Setting the Clock in the City of David" and led by Yuval Gadot, an archaeologist at Tel Aviv University together with Elisabetta Boaretto (Weizmann Institute  of  Science), plus two Israel Antiquities Authority archaeologists, Joe Uziel and Doron Ben Ami, intends to carbon-14 date sites in Jerusalem. At the time only ten reliable carbon dates existed from all of the city’s digs. According to Gadot, the chronology of Jerusalem is "an assumption on an assumption on an assumption". The results of several studies have been published including for the Gihon Spring Tower and for Wilson's Arch.

Archaeological sites

The remains at the site include several water tunnels, one of which was built by King Hezekiah and still carries water, several pools including the Pool of Siloam known from the Old and New Testaments, and in its vicinity scholars expect to find, or claim to have found, the remains of the Acra, a fortress built by Antiochus Epiphanes to subdue those Jerusalemites who were opposed to Hellenisation. City of David archaeologist Eilat Mazar believes that a so-called Large Stone Structure she has discovered at the upper area of the site and tentatively dated to the tenth to ninth century BC, may be the palace of King David. Not far from that excavation area a number of bullae (seal impressions) were unearthed, bearing the names of Yehucal son of Shelemiah and Gedaliah son of Pashhur, two officials mentioned in the Book of Jeremiah.

The Gihon Spring, which lies on the eastern slope of the southeastern hill of Jerusalem aka the City of David, and is generally considered the very reason why the city first emerged at this specific location. It has been noted that above the Gihon Spring was found a massive town wall, which wall is used to determine the location of the ancient settlement.  
The ancient water systems connected to the Gihon Spring include natural, masonry-built, and rock-cut structures, such as
The Spring Tower
Warren's Shaft, a natural shaft, once thought to have been a water supply system. Although within the bounds of the City of David, it is thought to have been inaccessible during the period attributed to King David.
The Siloam Channel, a Canaanite (Bronze Age) water system that preceded the Siloam Tunnel
The Siloam Tunnel (also known as Hezekiah's Tunnel), an Iron Age water supply system where the Siloam inscription was found
The Siloam Pool - two connected pools, an upper one from the Byzantine period at the exit of the Siloam Tunnel, and the recently discovered, lower pool dating to the Hasmonean part of the Second Temple Period.

The Giv'ati Parking Lot excavations extend over an area of about 5 dunams (1.2 acres). Within this area there are several built structures, spread over excavated sections known as Area A, B, C, ... which include:
The Large Stone Structure
The Stepped Stone Structure
City walls and towers, houses, a columbarium, rock-cut vaulted tunnels once interpreted as royal Judahite tombs, a rock-cut pool where the Theodotus Inscription was discovered (see here), etc.
 The Jerusalem Water Channel, a large drainage system
 A monumental stepped street probably used by Second Temple-period pilgrims and built over the Jerusalem Water Channel.

Other general areas include:
King's Garden (excavated in 1894–1897 by Bliss and Dickie).

Finds by period

Chalcolithic (4500–3500 BCE)
Chalcolithic remains include bits of pottery found in clefts in the bedrock by Macalister and Duncan. The expedition also discovered a number of places where the bedrock had been cut in various ways. These included areas where the rock had been smoothed and others where it had been cut to form flow channels. There were also several groups of small basins, sometimes called cup marks, cut into the bedrock. These are assumed to have been used for some form of agricultural processing. Macalister and Duncan speculated that they were used in olive oil processing.
Edwin C. M. van den Brink, who notes that similar carved basins have been found at Beit Shemesh and near Modi'in-Maccabim-Re'ut, speculates that they may have been created by repeated grinding and crushing activity, such as the grinding of grain or the crushing of olives. Eilat Mazar speculates that they were used to collect rainwater.

Early Bronze Age (3500–2350 BCE)
Pieces of pottery have been found.

Middle Bronze Age (2000–1550 BCE)
Middle Bronze Age Jerusalem is mentioned several times in Egyptian texts from the 19th–18th centuries BCE.

Late Bronze Age (1550–1200 BCE)

Pottery and bronze arrowheads dating form this period have been found.

In 2010, a fragment of a clay tablet dating from the 14th century BCE was uncovered, making it the oldest written document yet uncovered in Jerusalem. It is dated by the writing it bears, in an ancient Akkadian cuneiform script. The text was deciphered by graduate student Takayoshi Oshima working under professor Wayne Horowitz. According to Horowitz, the quality of the writing indicates that this was a royal inscription, apparently a letter from the king of Jerusalem to the pharaoh in Egypt. Professor Christopher Rollston points out that there is no mention of any personal names or titles and no place names in the document. He notes that the quality of the script is good but that this does not show that it is "international royal correspondence." He also suggests that caution should be taken before positing a definite date as it is not a stratified find, having been discovered after excavation in a "wet sieving" process.

Iron Age I (1200–980/70 BCE)

Iron Age IIa (1000–925/900 BCE)

The period of the tenth and ninth centuries BCE has been the subject of an intense scholarly dispute, as well as of ongoing archaeological investigations.

The 2005 discovery by archaeologist Eilat Mazar of a Large Stone Structure, which she dated to the tenth century BCE, would be evidence of buildings in Jerusalem of a size appropriate to the capital of a centralized kingdom at that time. Others, most notably Israel Finkelstein of Tel Aviv University, argue that the structure could, for the most part, be from the much later Hasmonean period. However, new evidence continues to emerge from the dig. Mazar's date is supported by 10th century imported luxury goods found within the Large Stone Structure, including two Phoenician-style ivory inlays once attached to iron objects. Comparable objects found in a Phoenician tomb at Achziv suggest that they may have decorated a sword handle. A quantity of luxury round, carinated bowls with red slip and hand burnishing support both the tenth century date and a sophisticated, urban lifestyle. A bone has been radiocarbon dated by Elisabetta Boaretto at the Weizmann Institute, showing a probable date between 1050 and 780 BCE. A large section of a "delicate and elegant" black-on-red jug, also found in the structure, is of a kind dated to the second half of the tenth century BCE.

In 2010 Mazar announced the discovery of what she believed to be a 10th-century BCE city wall. According to Mazar, "It's the most significant construction we have from First Temple days in Israel," and "It means that at that time, the 10th century, in Jerusalem there was a regime capable of carrying out such construction." Aren Maeir, an archaeology professor at Bar Ilan University, said he has yet to see evidence that the fortifications are as old as Mazar claims.

Doron Ben-Ami wrote in 2014 that, on the basis of his own excavations in the Givati parking lot area bordering on the "City of David" from the north-west, there was apparently no 10th-century city wall: "Had a fortified settlement existed in the City of David, then the course of the city wall on the west would have had to pass through the Givati excavation area. No such city wall has thus far been found. This means that the Iron Age IIa settlement [c. 1000–925 BCE] was not fortified." Ben-Ami's findings stand in stark contrast to those of R. Reich and E. Shukron who, on the basis of their findings, have disproved Warren's theory that King David (c. 1000 BCE) captured Jerusalem by entering into the city through the shaft now known as Warren's Shaft, and have concluded that the shaft was largely in disuse at that time, although it was within the city and the city was, indeed, encompassed by a monumental wall which they had excavated. This ancient wall, found on the eastern-most flank of the Kidron valley in the ancient City of David, rather than in the Giv'ati Parking Lot, was preserved in its full height (6 m.), measuring 2 m. in width.

The discrepancy can perhaps be attributed to the limited confines of the Giv'ati Parking Lot and where Ben-Ami and his team were expecting to find a wall when, in fact, the ancient wall went beyond the bounds of the excavated Parking Lot.

Iron Age IIb (c. 925-720 BCE)

Ben-Ami goes on saying that his Givati findings indicate that "the fortified city of the Iron IIB, which encompassed both the City of David and the Western Hill, had no need for a fortification line between these two sectors of the city."

The related necropolis (9th-7th centuries BCE)

The elaborate rock-cut tombs of the Israelite period, forming what is known as the Silwan necropolis and dating from the 9th to the 7th centuries BCE, are found outside Wadi Hilweh/the City of David, on the ridge on the opposite, eastern side of the Kidron Valley in and under the Arab village of Silwan. These are large, elaborate tombs of skilfully cut into the stone face of the eastern slope, such as could only have been built by the highest-ranking members of a wealthy society. According to David Ussishkin, "here ministers, nobles and notables of the kingdom of Judah were buried."

The architecture of the tombs and the manner of burial is different "from anything known from contemporary Palestine. Elements such as entrances located high above the surface, gabled ceilings, straight ceilings with a cornice,13 trough-shaped resting-places with pillows, above-ground tombs, and inscriptions engraved on the facade appear only here." However, the stone benches were carved with headrests in a style borrowed from the Egyptian Hathor wig. Ussishkin believes that the architectural similarity to building styles of the Phoenician cities validates the biblical description of Phoenician influence on the Israelite kingdoms, but speculates that some or all of the tombs may have been built by Phoenician aristocrats living in Jerusalem.

Although only three partial inscriptions survive, the paleography makes the dating certain  and they suffice for most archaeologists to identify one tomb with the Biblical Shebna, steward and treasurer of King Hezekiah.

Iron Age IIIb (8th century – 586 BCE)
This is the period that corresponds to the biblical Kings Hezekiah through Josiah and the destruction of the Kingdom of Judah by Nebuchadnezzar II.

King Hezekiah secured the city's water supply against siege by employing his men to dig a  conduit deep within the meleke limestone bedrock and, in so doing, to divert the waters of the Gihon Spring to a place on the west side of the City of David, and covering over all signs of the source of the spring and the fortifications that had surrounded it in earlier periods. He built the Pool of Siloam as a water reservoir. Hezekiah then surrounded the new reservoir and the city's burgeoning western suburbs with a new city wall.

Bullae with the names of Yehucal son of Shelemiah and Gedaliah son of Pashhur, two officials mentioned in the Book of Jeremiah, have been found.

In 2019, during the excavations of the Givati Parking lot, a seal bearing Paleo-Hebrew inscription was discovered, belonging to "Natan-Melech the King’s Servant".

Babylonian and Persian periods (586–322 BCE)
Two bullae in the Neo-Babylonian style, one showing a priest standing beside an altar to the gods Marduk and Nabu. A polished, black, scaraboid stone seal showing a "Babylonian cultic scene" of two bearded men standing on each side of an altar dedicated to the Babylonian moon god Sin. The scaraboid is understood to have been produced in Babylonia, with space left below that altar for a personal name. In that space are Hebrew letters that Peter van der Veen has read as the name Shelomit.

Hasmoneans, Herodians and Roman governors (167 BCE – 70 CE)

Major archaeological finds include the Pool of Siloam, and the monumental stepped road built by Pilate and drained by an impressive channel. Active Roman-era excavations are also underway at the Givati Parking Lot dig site, where the remains of a palace attributed to Queen Helena of Adiabene were discovered in 2007.

Byzantine period (324–628 CE)

The Byzantine-period mansion called the "Eusebius" house stood in the area now underneath the visitor's center, atop the central part of E. Mazar's Large Stone Structure.

During the excavation of the area adjacent to the west, the so-called Givati Parking Lot dig, many Byzantine-period finds were made, including a hoard of 264 gold coins from the time of Emperor Heraclius (7th century CE).

Criticism 
In 2018, a leaked report by the European Union cited the area as one being developed for tourism to justify settlements and insist on Jewish heritage at the expense of its Palestinian context.

Israeli archaeology at the site has been criticized; Tel Aviv University Professor Rafi Greenberg stated that archaeological practice at the site is "completely subsumed to political and corporate motivations that are, however, largely unacknowledged by its "neutral" practitioners, leading to questionable field practice and overtly skewed interpretations of the past".

In a 2015 report on Israeli archaeology, the National Academy of Sciences criticized the political use of archeology and the extensive cooperation between Elad and the Nature and Parks Authority. Elad's head, David Be’eri, declined to appear before the committee and said the report was biased against Elad.

Tourism

The entire site, including the Gihon Spring and the two Pools of Siloam, is incorporated in an archaeological park open to the public. Visitors can wade through the Siloam Tunnel, through which the waters of the ancient spring still flow, although the change in the water table in recent times mean that the once intermittent karstic spring is now artificially maintained through pumping.

References

Notes

Citations

Sources

 Broshi, M. (1974). "The expansion of Jerusalem in the reigns of Hezekiah and Manasseh." Israel Exploration Journal, pp. 21–26

, Chapter 7: The City of David / Silwan

 

Mazar, Eilat (2009), "The Palace of King David, Excavations at the Summit of the City of David. Preliminary Report of Seasons 2005–2007." Shoham: Jerusalem and New York

 Pullan, Wendy, 'City of David': Urban Design and Frontier Heritage, January 2009, The Jerusalem Quarterly, 39

External links

 Ancient Silwan (Shiloah) {Siloam} in Israel and The City of David
 City of David link, 2008 archived version
 From Shiloah to Silwan project
 Did I Find King David's Palace? Biblical Archaeology Review
 The Dig Dividing Jerusalem: Ahdaf Soueif writes on Silwan in the Guardian
 Amit Rosenblum. City of David: Conservation Maintenance, Israel Antiquities Authority Site - Conservation Department
 Ivanovsky E., Van Zaiden A., Vaknin Y., Asamain, T., Sabag, S. (2007). City of David, Givati Car Park: Stabilization and post-excavation conservation, Israel Antiquities Authority Site - Conservation Department
 10 reasons the “City of David” is not the wholesome tourist site you thought it was

 
Hebrew Bible mountains
Neighbourhoods of Jerusalem
Archaeological sites in Jerusalem
Siloam
Former populated places in Southwest Asia
Ancient Jewish settlements of Judaea
Hebrew Bible cities
Biblical geography
Ancient Jewish history
East Jerusalem